The Arquetu is a mythological being that appears in Cantabrian mythology as an old man with the drawing of a green cross and 7 keys on his forehead. He lends money to those foolish enough to spend their fortune but if they do it again, he punishes them by giving them a curse of eternal poverty.

References 

Cantabrian legendary creatures